Sreto Perić (born September 23, 1959) is a Serbian politician. He is currently serving his fourth term in the National Assembly of Serbia as a member of the far-right Serbian Radical Party.

Private career
Perić has a bachelor of laws degree and is based in Ljubovija.

Political career
Perić received the twenty-eighth position on the Radical Party's electoral list for the 2003 Serbian parliamentary election. The party won eighty-two seats, and Perić was subsequently included in its assembly delegation, taking his seat when the assembly met in early 2004. (From 2000 to 2011, Serbian parliamentary mandates were awarded to sponsoring parties or coalitions rather than to individual candidates, and it was common practice for mandates to be awarded out of numerical order. Perić did not automatically receive a mandate by virtue of his list position, but he was awarded a mandate all the same.) Although the Radical Party received more seats than any other party in the 2003 election, they fell well short of a majority and ultimately served in opposition.

Perić was included on the Radical Party's electoral lists for the 2007 and 2008 parliamentary elections  and was again selected to serve in the party's assembly delegation on both occasions. The Radical Party remained in opposition throughout this period. The party experienced a significant split in late 2008, with many of its members joining the more centrist Serbian Progressive Party under the leadership of Tomislav Nikolić and Aleksandar Vučić. Perić remained with the Radicals.

Serbia's electoral system was reformed in 2011, such that parliamentary mandates were awarded in numerical order to candidates on successful lists. Perić received the twenty-third position on the Radical Party's list in the 2012 Serbian parliamentary election, in which the party failed to cross the electoral threshold to win representation in the assembly. He was promoted to the nineteenth position in the 2014 election, in which the party again failed to win representation.

The Radicals returned to the assembly with the 2016 election, winning twenty-two mandates. Perić, who received the fourteenth position on the party's list, was accordingly re-elected. The party once again serves in opposition. Perić is currently a member of the assembly committee on the judiciary, public administration, and local self-government; a deputy member of the committee on spatial planning, transport, infrastructure, and communications; and a member of the parliamentary friendship groups with Belarus, Kazakhstan, Slovakia, and Spain.

Perić has been a member of the Radical Party's presidency and has been a Radical member of the municipal assembly in Ljubovija. In 2009, during a heated debate on the legitimacy of an assembly meeting, he threw and broke a microphone that was situated in front of the speaker. He has also been the regional chair of the Radical Party's committee in Podrinje in the Republika Srpska.

References

1959 births
Living people
People from Ljubovija
Members of the National Assembly (Serbia)
Serbian Radical Party politicians